Vasa Stajić (10 February 1878 — 10 February 1947) was a Serbian writer and philosopher. He was born in Mokrin in 1878, and died in Novi Sad in 1947 where he spent most of his life. He was secretary of the Serbian Cultural Society from 1920-1922 and its president twice (1935-1936 and 1947). A statue of him appears in front of the Serbian Cultural Society.

Stajić wrote several biographies of famous people and families. He was one of the most important figures of modern cultural and political Vojvodina.

Early life

Stajić was born in Mokrin. He went to high school in Kikinda, Sremski  and Senj. As a student he was expelled from the Karlovci Gymnasium. He studied law, then philosophy in Budapest, Paris and Leipzig. He graduated in 1902 in Budapest.
In 1904 and 1905, he taught at Pakrac and at Pljevlja gymnasium, where he had a colleague, professor and historian Gligorije Elezović.

Vasa Stajić published a socialist journal called Novi Srbin and Prosveta magazine and, because of his ideas, he was frequently arrested and questioned by the authorities. In Novi Sad, he became secretary of the Matica srpska, one of the most important Serbian cultural institutions of the Kingdom of Serbs, Croats and Slovenes and of the Kingdom of Yugoslavia, and in 1921 and 1936 he was editor of "Letopis" (Chronicle), the official organ of this institution.

He has written more than twenty books, including  Novosadske biografije  (Biographies of Novi Sad) in six volumes and  Velikokikindski dištrikt  (The District of Velika Kikinda). He also published studies on Svetozar Miletić (1926) and Jovan Jovanović Zmaj (1933) as well as more than 100 scholarly articles. After World War II, he was president of Matica srpska, a position he held until his death.
There are schools in Mokrin and Novi Sad named after him.

References

External links
Vasa Stajić
 

Serbian political philosophers
Serbian writers
1878 births
1947 deaths
20th-century Serbian philosophers
Austro-Hungarian writers